The LG Optimus 7 (also known as the LG-E900) is a slate smartphone which runs Microsoft's Windows Phone operating system. The Optimus 7 is part of the first-generation Windows Phone line-up launched in October 2010.

Technical issues

Update issues
Several users reported an error while updating their handsets to Windows Phone 7.5 via Zune which only seemed to affect users with firmware versions 1.0.1.12 and 1.1.2.10. Newer versions of the firmware do not seem to have this problem. Certain users have reported the error has been removed after re-flashing their device ROM via an Authorised LG Support Center or restoring the previous version of their device and updating to Mango again.

Overheating
The Optimus 7 has a tendency to heat to a high temperature when the handset is left to run an application for an extended period of time. This behavior has also been noted during charging. Due to the device's metal battery cover, the handset tends to retain any heat generated.
It has also been reported that the phone can reboot after reaching high temperatures. Upon rebooting, the phone can hang at the LG start-up logo, necessitating the user to reset the device manually.

See also
LG Quantum
Windows Phone

Comparable Devices
LG Quantum
HTC HD7
Samsung Omnia 7
HTC 7 Trophy
Nokia Lumia 520

References

External links
Official LG Optimus 7 homepage

Windows Phone devices
LG Electronics smartphones
Mobile phones introduced in 2010
Discontinued smartphones